Borek is a municipality and village in Jičín District in the Hradec Králové Region of the Czech Republic. It has about 90 inhabitants.

Administrative parts
Villages of Bezník and Želejov are administrative parts of Borek.

References

Villages in Jičín District